The doubles tournament of the 2007 Gastein Ladies took place on 23–29 July on outdoor clay courts in Bad Gastein, Austria. Lucie Hradecká and Renata Voráčová won the title, defeating Ágnes Szávay and Vladimíra Uhlířová in the final.

Seeds

Draw

References 
 Draw

2007 Doubles
Gastein Ladies - Doubles
Gast
Gast